Paradise is the fifth album by soul vocalist  Peabo Bryson.

Reception

Released in Spring 1980, this album would chart on the R&B album charts at number thirteen.

Track listing
All tracks composed by Peabo Bryson; except where indicated.
"Love Has No Shame" - 5:57
"Minute By Minute" (Lester Abrams, Michael McDonald) - 3:20
"I Love The Way You Love" - 5:10
"Paradise" - 5:35
"Love in Every Season" - 6:25
"When Will I Learn" - 4:14
"I Believe in You" - 6:30
"Life Is a Child" - 5:30

Personnel 
 Peabo Bryson – lead and backing vocals, keyboards, percussion; horn, rhythm and string arrangements
 Vance Taylor – Fender Rhodes, synthesizers, backing vocals
 James Boling, Jr. – synthesizers, trumpet
 Terry Dukes – synthesizers, backing vocals
 Richard Horton – guitars
 Dwight Watkins – bass, backing vocals
 Andre Robinson – drums, timpani
 Chuck Bryson – percussion, backing vocals
 Cissy Alexander – handclaps
 Sheri Byers – handclaps
 Louise Foster – handclaps
 Larry McIntosh – handclaps
 Linda Patz – handclaps
 Ron Dover – tenor saxophone, sax solo (3, 5)
 Dan Dillard – trombone, trumpet solo (2)
 Thad Johnson – trumpet, trumpet solo (7)
 Gayle Levant – harp
 Johnny Pate – horn and string arrangements, conductor
 Gerard Vinci – concertmaster

Production 
 Producers – Peabo Bryson and Johnny Pate
 Executive Producer – Cecil Hale
 Recorded and Mixed by Rik Pekkonen at Hollywood Sound Recorders (Hollywood, CA).
 Mastered by Bernie Grundman at A&M Studios (Hollywood, CA).
 Art Direction and Photography – Daniela Morera
 Design – Aerographics

Charts

Singles

External links
 Peabo Bryson-Paradise at Discogs

References

1980 albums
Capitol Records albums
Peabo Bryson albums
Albums arranged by Johnny Pate
Albums produced by Johnny Pate